Poos is a surname. Notable people with the surname include:

 Christian Poos (born 1977), Luxembourgian cyclist
 Jacques Poos (1935–2022), Luxembourgian politician
 Omer Poos (1902–1976), American federal judge